Snorrason may refer to:

Ólafur Páll Snorrason (born 1982), Icelandic international footballer who plays club football as a striker
Oddr Snorrason, Latin royal biography attributed to a 12th-century Icelandic Benedictine monk at the Thingeyrar Monastery (Þingeyrarklaustur)
Snorrason Holdings, Icelandic holding company with primary interests in online payment processing
Snorri Snorrason (born 1977), Icelandic singer who rose to popularity after winning Idol Stjörnuleit 3, the Icelandic version of Pop Idol